Francisco "Kit" Sarmiento Tatad (born October 4, 1939) is a Filipino journalist and politician best known for having served as Minister of Public Information under President Ferdinand Marcos from 1969 to 1980, and for serving as a Senator of the Philippines from 1992 to 2001.

Upon his appointment by President Marcos, Tatad became the youngest member of Marcos' cabinet. During his term, he announced the declaration of Martial Law on September 23, 1972, just hours before Marcos himself came on the air. While serving as cabinet secretary, he concurrently became a member of the Batasang Pambansa.

During his service in the Philippines Senate, he served as Majority Floor Leader from 1996 to 1998 and again from 2000 to 2001. Another historical moment in Tatad's career came in 2001, when he was one of the 11 senators who voted against opening an envelope that had been alleged to contain incriminating evidence against then Philippine President Joseph Ejercito Estrada, inciting events that led to the EDSA Revolution of 2001.

Early life and education
Tatad was born on October 4, 1939, in Gigmoto, Catanduanes. He attended Gigmoto Elementary School. His family later moved to Manila where he finished his secondary education at the Roosevelt College in Cubao, Quezon City. He attended college at the University of Santo Tomas where he studied philosophy. As a Thomasian, he was the literary editor of The Varsitarian in 1960. One of his short stories was published in a Hong Kong-based Asian magazine. He was barred from finishing his degree after organizing an unapproved symposium in the university.

After being prohibited from finishing Philosophy, he studied Business Economics at the Center for Research and Communication (now University of Asia and the Pacific).

Career

Journalistic career
After finishing his tertiary education, Tatad worked as a journalist and columnist for various agencies. In the 1960s, he was a correspondent for the Agence France-Presse and columnist and reporter at the Manila Daily Bulletin. He was also a writer for the International Herald Tribune, The Wall Street Journal Asia, the Far Eastern Economic Review, the Washington Quarterly, Business Day and the Philippine Daily Globe.

From 1989 to 1991, he was the publisher and editor of Newsday, a business and political daily newspaper. Apart from being a journalist, Tatad is also the author of five books, namely, The Prospects of the Filipino, The Philippines in 1986, Guarding the Public Trust, A Nation on Fire: The Unmaking of Joseph Ejercito Estrada and the Remaking of Democracy in the Philippines and The Forbidden Life of Amargo Raz.

Marcos and Aquino years (1969–1987)
In 1969, President Ferdinand Marcos appointed Tatad as Minister of Public Information, becoming the youngest member of Marcos' cabinet.

Tatad gained prominence when he went on air at 3 p.m. on September 23, 1972, and read the text of Proclamation № 1081, through which Marcos declared martial law. Marcos himself went on air at 7:15 p.m. to present his justifications for declaring martial law, but it was through Tatad's announcement four hours earlier that the public was first officially informed about martial law.

In 1978, he was elected an Assemblyman of the Interim Batasang Pambansa representing Bicol, garnering the highest number of votes among the 12 representatives representing the region. Two years later, in 1980, he resigned as Minister of Public Information and was succeeded by Gregorio Cendaña.

In 1987, a year after the People Power Revolution that ousted Marcos and installed Corazon Aquino as president, Tatad ran as senator under the Grand Alliance for Democracy, which opposed the policies of Corazon Aquino, but lost.

Senator (1992–2001)

In 1992, he ran for senator under the Nationalist People's Coalition of Marcos' crony Eduardo Cojuangco Jr. and won. He authored the Electric Power Crisis Act which helped end the 1992-1993 electric power crisis. He sought a second term under the Lakas-Laban Coalition of President Fidel Ramos in 1995 and was reelected.

He was first elected as Senate Majority Floor Leader in 1996 and served until 1998. He was elected to the post again in 2000 and served until he finished his term in 2001.

In 1997, he filed a petition to challenge the constitutionality of the Oil Deregulation Law before the Supreme Court.

In January 2001, during the impeachment trial of President Joseph Estrada, he was one of the 11 senators who voted against opening an envelope that was alleged to contain incriminating evidence against Estrada. Public anger over the Senate vote triggered the EDSA Revolution of 2001, leading to the ouster of Estrada and the accession of Vice-President Gloria Macapagal Arroyo to the presidency.

As a legislator, he authored or sponsored 22 laws and was described by the media as the "Moral Conscience of the Senate" because of his conservative stance to issues such as contraception and the Reproductive Health Bill.

Later life

Tatad ran again for senator under the Koalisyon ng Nagkakaisang Pilipino of actor Fernando Poe Jr. in 2004 but lost. In 2007, he resigned from the governing board of the United Opposition as a protest against the party's decision to draft Alan Peter Cayetano, Joseph Victor Ejercito and Aquilino Pimentel III as its senatorial candidates due to issues of "dynasty-building", as the three have relatives already serving in the Senate. In 2010, he ran again for senator but lost, finishing only in the 27th place.

During the hearing on the impeachment of Chief Justice Renato Corona on January 19, 2012, Tatad had a verbal confrontation with Senator-Judge Franklin Drilon, accusing him of acting like a part of the prosecution team. Drilon allegedly challenged him to disqualify him from participating in the proceedings.

References

External links
 List of Previous Senators
 First Things First (Blog)
 Kit Tatad - Bills Enacted into Law
 PROFILE: Francisco “KIT” Sarmiento Tatad

1939 births
Living people
Bicolano politicians
Majority leaders of the Senate of the Philippines
Senators of the 11th Congress of the Philippines
Senators of the 10th Congress of the Philippines
Senators of the 9th Congress of the Philippines
Presidential spokespersons (Philippines)
Nationalist People's Coalition politicians
People from Catanduanes
People's Reform Party politicians
Pwersa ng Masang Pilipino politicians
Candidates in the 1998 Philippine vice-presidential election
University of Santo Tomas alumni
Ferdinand Marcos administration cabinet members
Members of the Batasang Pambansa